The 2014 UCI Women's Road World Cup is the 17th edition of the UCI Women's Road World Cup and part of the 2014 UCI women's calendar. One race was added compared to the 2013 edition: the German Giro Bochum. This race was already on the women's calendar since 2001 as 1.1 category race.



Races

Source

Results

Source

Leader progress

Teams
The top 20 teams in the UCI Women's Teams Ranking as of 10 January 2014 have automatically the right to start in the races and are listed below. Other 2014 UCI Women's Teams are only allowed to start after an invitation.

References

External links
Official site

See also
2014 in women's road cycling

 
UCI Women's Road World Cup
UCI Women's Road World Cup